The Supreme Council of Justice is the national council of the judiciary of Ukraine, which nominates judges to be appointed by the President of Ukraine. In 2021, the Ethics Council was created with the intention of selecting the members of the Supreme Council of Justice in a way that would help to create an independent and efficient judiciary in Ukraine.

Functions
The Supreme Council of Justice of Ukraine advises on the appointment or release of certain judges, examines the cases of infringements, and executes disciplinary proceedings involving judges of the Supreme Court of Ukraine and other high specialized courts.

Composition
There are total of 21 members. The term of membership in the council is four years. It is forbidden to be a member of the council for two tenures in a row.

The appointees include:
 ex officio the Chairman of the Supreme Court of Ukraine
 10 appointees of the Congress of Judges of Ukraine
 2 appointees of the Verkhovna Rada
 2 appointees of the President of Ukraine
 2 appointees of the Congress of Advocates of Ukraine
 2 appointees of the Congress of representative from law schools and scientific institutions
 2 appointees of the All-Ukrainian Conference of Employees of Procurocy (Prosecutors)

Membership requirements are:
 citizenship of Ukraine
 older than 35 years
 higher judicial education
 practicing of law no less than 15 years
 she or he must be politically neutral

Ineligible for membership are:
elected government officials
members of political parties
individuals who work for political parties or for other organizations with political goals or that takes part in political activities
individuals who take part in the organization or funding of political campaigns and other (political) activities

Publications
Official materials of the council is published in the Bulletin of the Supreme Court of Ukraine and in special cases in "Holos Ukrainy" and "Uryadovyi kurier".

History
In 2017 it replaced the High Council of Justice (“Вища рада юстицїї”). The same year the competence to appoint and to remove judges was transferred from the Ukrainian Parliament (Verkhovna Rada) to the Supreme Council of Justice.

The council was established on March 31, 1998 with the first session of it. The first chairman of the council became Valeri Yevdokimov. Its revamped 2017 version was established in January 2017.

In 2021, the Ethics Council was legally defined by law No. 1635-IX, "On amendments to certain legislative acts of Ukraine concerning the procedure for selection (appointment) to the positions of members of the High Council of Justice and the activities of disciplinary inspectors of the High Council of Justice". In November 2021, the composition of the Ethics Council was set, with three Ukrainian members, Supreme Court judge Lev Kyshakevych, Kyiv Court of Appeal judge Yuriy Tryasun, and retired judge Volodymyr Siverin; and three international members, British retired judge Anthony Hooper, United States retired judge Robert J. Cordy and former Estonian prosecutor-general . In June 2022, the Council started confirming, appointing and refusing members of the Supreme Council of Justice. Anti-corruption organisations including AutoMaidan objected to the Council's decisions.

List of chairmen of the Council
 March 31, 1998 - May 25, 2001—Valeri Yevdokimov, end of term
 May 25, 2001 - March 10, 2004—Serhiy Kivalov, becoming Head of the Central Election Commission of Ukraine
 March 10, 2004 - January 13, 2006—Mykola Shelest, becoming judge of the Supreme Court of Ukraine
 January 13, 2006 - March 28, 2007 -- (acting) Lidiya Izovitova
 March 28, 2007 - March 22, 2010—Lidiya Izovitova, end of term
 March 22, 2010 - ????—Volodymyr Kolesnychenko
 ???? - present—Ihor Benedysiuk

See also
Judiciary of Ukraine

References

External links 
Official web-site of the Supreme Council of Justice of Ukraine

Government of Ukraine
Judiciary of Ukraine
National councils of the judiciary